Naval Air Station Livermore has nearby airfield landing strips to support the training of US Navy pilots during World War 2. The airfield are called Naval Outlying Landing Field (NOLFs). For the war many new trained pilots were needed. The Naval Outlying Landing Fields provided a place for pilots to practice landing and take off without other air traffic. The remotes sites offered flight training without distractions. Most of the new pilots departed to the Pacific War after training. The Outlying Landing Fields had little or no support facilities. Naval Air Station Livermore opened in 1942 and closed in 1951. The Outlying field closed in 1945, having completed the role of training over 4000 new pilots.  To open the needed Outlying Landing Fields quickly, the Navy took over local crop dusting and barnstorming airfields.  

The Naval Air Station Livermore Outlying Fields were:

Abel NOLF

Abel NOLF, Abel Naval Naval Auxiliary Landing Field, was a World War 2 training airstrip. The Navy took over the Warm Springs Airport built in 1933 and built a new runway nearby. The Airport became a satellite for Livermore NAS in 1943. The Navy ended the use of the runway in 1945. In 1946 Warm Springs Airport, also called Milpitas Airport and Warm Springs Gliderport, became a public airport for airplanes and gliders. The Airport offered training, charters, repairs and model airplane flying. The airport had a single unpaved north/south 3,800-foot runway. In the Spring of 1952 the airport closed and became a housing tract.

Brown-Fabian NOLF
Brown-Fabian NOLF, Brown-Fabian Naval Outlying Landing Field was a World War 2 training airstrip used from 1943 to 1945. The Navy took over the Brown-Fabian Airport for training. The satellite airfield had a 6,300-foot sod runway. The site closed after the war and is now farmland.

Cope Field NOLF
Cope Field NOLF, Cope Field Naval Outlying Landing Field was a satellite runway for Livermore NAS, it had a single 3200' sod runway. The  Naval Outlying Landing Field was used from 1943 to 1945. The site is now a gravel pit.

Gelderman NOLF
Gelderman NOLF, Gelderman Naval Outlying Landing Field was a World War 2 training airstrip used from 1943 to 1945. The Navy took over the Gelderman Airport for training. The satellite airfield was a 2,200-foot sod runway. The site is now houses in San Ramon, California

Heath NOLF 

Heath NOLF, Heath Naval Outlying Landing Field was a World War 2 training airstrip used from 1943 to 1945. Heath NOLF had a northwest/southeast 3,100-foot concrete runway. In 1950 the runway became a civil airport, Skyways Airport, later in 1959 renamed Sky Sailing sailplane field, Sky Sailing Airport in 1959. The Sky Sailing Airport was a very active glider airport with a glider school, paid glider rides, and private gliders parked there. The Fremont Dragstrip also operated at the airport from 1959 until the end of 1988. The I-880 freeway was built on part of the old Heath NOLF in 1984. The airport closed in June of 1989 and is now commercial property.

Lindeman NOLF
Lindeman NOLF, Lindeman  Naval Outlying Landing Field was a World War 2 training airstrip used from 1943 to 1945. The Navy took over the Lindeman  Airport for training. The satellite airfield was a 3,900-foot sod runway, now houses.

Livermore NOLF 

Livermore NOLF, Livermore Naval Outlying Landing Field was a World War 2 training airstrip used from 1943 to 1945. The Navy took over the Livermore Sky Ranch built in 1929 for training. The satellite airfield was just North of Naval Air Station Livermore and has a 4,000-foot sod runway, now the `. In the 1930s, the Civil Aeronautics Administration (CAA) classified the Airport as a civil emergency airfield known as Livermore Intermediate Airport.

May's School NOLF

May's School NOLF, May's School Naval Outlying Landing Field, Mays auxiliary airfield was a World War 2 training airstrip used from 1943 to 1945 on 200 acres. The Navy built May's School Field for training pilots. The satellite airfield was also called Silva Barthe Field, had four unpaved runways. In the 1990s the site became a Federal Communications Commission antenna farm, called the Livermore Monitoring Station, the site is now just outside the city.

Rita Butterworth NOLF
Rita Butterworth NOLF, Rita Butterworth Naval Outlying Landing Field was a World War 2 training airstrip used from 1943 to 1945. The Navy took over the Rita Butterworth Airportt for training. The satellite airfield had a 3,000-foot sod runway, now a vacant lot and commercial property in Dublin, California just north of the I-580 freeway and west of Fallon Road.

Spring Valley NOLF
Spring Valley NOLF, Spring Valley Naval Outlying Landing Field was a World War 2 training airstrip used from 1943 to 1945. The Navy took over the Spring Valley Airport for training. The satellite airfield was a 3,500-foot sod runway, now houses.

Wagoner NOLF
Wagoner NOLF, Wagoner Naval Outlying Landing Field was a World War 2 training airstrip used from 1943 to 1945. The Navy took over the Wagoner Airport for training. The Wagoner Airport had a 3,000-foot sod runway, in 1943 the Navy built a 2,700-foot x 3,000-foot paved landing pad on the site. After the war the site was closed and turned over to the county, the site is now houses.

See also

California during World War II
American Theater (1939–1945)
United States home front during World War II

References

California in World War II
Formerly Used Defense Sites in California
1943 establishments in California
Livermore, California